Petteri Rasi is a Finnish professional ice hockey player who currently plays for KalPa of the SM-liiga.

See also
Ice hockey in Finland

References

External links

Living people
KalPa players
Year of birth missing (living people)
Finnish ice hockey forwards